The rivière des Poitras is a tributary of the south bank of the Morigeau River which flows on the south-eastern bank of the rivière du Sud (Montmagny) ; the latter flows north-east to the south shore of the St. Lawrence River.

The Poitras river flows in the municipalities of Saint-Pierre-de-la-Rivière-du-Sud and Saint-François-de-la-Rivière-du-Sud, in the Montmagny Regional County Municipality, in the administrative region of Chaudière-Appalaches, in Quebec, in Canada.

Geography 
The main neighboring watersheds of the Poitras river are:
 north side: Morigeau River, rivière du Sud (Montmagny), Bras Saint-Nicolas, St. Lawrence River;
 east side: rivière des Perdrix, Bédule stream, Bras Saint-Nicolas;
 south side: Noire River (South River tributary), rivière du Sud (Montmagny);
 west side: rivière du Sud (Montmagny).

From its source, the Poitras river flows in parallel, on the south side of the Morigeau River.
  west in Saint-Pierre-de-la-Rivière-du-Sud, up to the municipal limit of Saint-François-de-la-Rivière-du-Sud;
  west, to a country road;
  north-west, up to its confluence.

The Poitras river flows on the south-eastern shore of the Morigeau River.

Toponymy 
The toponym Rivière des Poitras was formalized on December 5, 1968, at the Commission de toponymie du Québec.

See also 

 List of rivers of Quebec

References 

Rivers of Chaudière-Appalaches
Montmagny Regional County Municipality